Tây Giang is a rural district (huyện) of Quảng Nam province in the South Central Coast region of Vietnam. As of 2003 the district had a population of 13,926. The district covers an area of 901 km². The district capital lies at A Tiêng.

References

Districts of Quảng Nam province